Edith Macefield (August 21, 1921 – June 15, 2008) was a real estate holdout who received worldwide attention in 2006 when she turned down an offer of $ to sell her house to make way for a commercial development in the Ballard neighborhood of Seattle, Washington (originally reported as a package worth $750,000). Instead, the five-story project was built surrounding her 108-year-old farmhouse, where she died at age 86 in 2008. In the process, she became something of a folk hero.

After she died, Macefield willed her house to the new building's construction superintendent, Barry Martin, in gratitude for his friendship and caretaker role. Martin told the Seattle Post-Intelligencer, "Two or three times she was basically going to sell and move, and then I know the last time she ended up falling and breaking some ribs, and that kind of took the gas out of her, and then it was just too much work."

Early life
Macefield was born in Oregon in 1921 and learned French, German, and other languages. She joined the military and was sent to England, where she was later taken out of the service after officials discovered she was not 18 years old. Macefield stayed in England where she took care of war orphans, and later moved back home, where she took care of her mother and worked at Washington Dental Service.

She was married four times, all in Europe. She outlived her last three husbands and her only child (a son who died at 13 from spinal meningitis) by decades.

House

Macefield turned down a reported $ offer to sell her home in  2006 to make way for a commercial development in the Ballard neighborhood of Seattle. In the process, she became something of a folk hero. Instead, the five-story project was built surrounding her 108-year-old farmhouse, where she died at age 86 from pancreatic cancer. The house is located at 1438 NW 46th St.

Legacy

As she intended, she died at her family home. She was buried in Evergreen Washelli Cemetery, Seattle, beside her mother, who had died in 1976 on the same couch as she did.

Curtis James of Anchor Tattoo, a Ballard tattoo artist, has since created a design based on Macefield's house in remembrance of her, and as a commitment to, "holding on to things that are important to you." As of June 2015, more than 30 people were reported to have had the tattoo.

On May 26, 2009, Disney publicists attached balloons to the roof of Macefield's house, as a promotional tie-in to their film, Up, in which an aging widower's home is similarly surrounded by looming development. However, scriptwriting and production on Up began in 2004, two years before Macefield's refusal to sell to the property developers.

In July 2009, Barry Martin sold the house to real estate investor Greg Pinneo for $310,000. Pinneo intended to use the house as an office to run his real estate coaching firm Reach Returns. However, on March 13, 2015, the house went through foreclosure auction and was subsequently put back on the market. Pinneo had failed to pay back taxes on the house.

The inaugural Macefield Music Festival was held October 5, 2013, in Ballard. The event included multiple musical genres, in several venues. The promoters said it "will be an affordable way to explore the current landscape of Seattle music while celebrating the steadfast attitude of the dearly departed Ms. Macefield."

A 99% Invisible podcast titled "Holdout" (#130) discussed the story of Macefield.

BBC Radio 4 broadcast a play, The Macefield Plot written by Daniel Thurman, on May 14, 2019, (repeated in June 2021). Directed by David Hunter, it starred Siân Phillips as Macefield and Stanley Townsend as Barry Martin.

See also
 Other real-estate holdouts:
 Vera Coking, Atlantic City, New Jersey
 Figo House, Oregon
 Michael Forbes, Scotland
 Wu Ping, southwest China
Eminent domain
Kelo v. City of New London

Notes

1921 births
2008 deaths
Real estate holdout
People from Seattle
Deaths from pancreatic cancer
Deaths from cancer in Washington (state)
People from North Bend, Oregon